Johan Sparre af Söfdeborg (10 January 1715, Karlskrona - 3 March 1791, Tosterup) was a Swedish count and general.

1715 births
1791 deaths
Swedish nobility
Swedish generals